Up in Duke's Workshop is an album by the American pianist, composer and bandleader Duke Ellington that collects sessions recorded in 1969, 1970, 1971 and 1972, released on the Pablo label in 1979.

Reception
The AllMusic review by Scott Yanow states: "This LP is primarily for Duke Ellington completists and scholars. Some of the performances are runthroughs of works that would soon be discarded or rewritten while others are true obscurities... nothing all that essential or historic occurs and there are over 100 currently available Duke Ellington recordings that one would recommend first".

Track listing
All compositions by Duke Ellington except as indicated
 "Blem" - 6:55
 "Goof" - 3:14
 "Dick" - 2:57
 "Love Is Just Around the Corner" (Lewis Gensler, Leo Robin) - 4:23
 "Bateau" - 5:23
 "Wanderlust" (Ellington, Johnny Hodges) - 6:26
 "Neo-Creole" - 3:52
 "Black Butterfly" (Ellington, Irving Mills) - 3:40
 "Mendoza" - 5:43
Recorded at National Recording Studio in New York on April 25, 1969 (track 1), 23 May 1969 (track 2), June 20, 1969 (track 3), June 15, 1970 (track 4), December 9, 1970 (track 5), February 1, 1971 (track 6), February 3, 1971 (track 7), June 29, 1971 (track 8), December 6, 1972 (track 9).

Personnel
Duke Ellington – piano
Wild Bill Davis - organ (track 4-7)
Cat Anderson (tracks 2, 4-8), Johnny Coles (track 9), Willie Cook (tracks 1-8), Mercer Ellington (tracks 3, 4, 6-9), Money Johnson (tracks 3, 5 & 9), Jimmy Owens (track 2), Eddie Preston (track 6), Al Rubin (track 5), Fred Stone (track 4), Cootie Williams - trumpet
Lawrence Brown (track 2), Buster Cooper (track 2), Tyree Glenn, (track 9), Benny Green (tracks 1 & 3), Benny Powell (track 1), Julian Priester (tracks 4-8), Vince Prudente (track 9), Malcolm Taylor (track 5), Booty Wood (track 4-8) - trombone
Chuck Connors (tracks 2 & 4-9) - bass trombone
Russell Procope - clarinet, alto saxophone
Harold Minerve - flute, alto
Johnny Hodges (tracks 2 & 3), Buddy Pearson (track 8), Norris Turney (tracks 2-5) - alto saxophone
Paul Gonsalves, Harold Ashby - tenor saxophone
Harry Carney - baritone saxophone
Joe Benjamin (track 4-8), Victor Gaskin (tracks 2 & 3), Paul Kondziela (tracks 1-3) - bass
Rufus Jones - drums

References

Pablo Records albums
Duke Ellington albums
1979 albums